Formosa do Sul is a Brazilian municipality in the state of Santa Catarina. The elevation is 500 m. The population in 2020 was 2,495. The area is 100 km².

See also
List of municipalities in Santa Catarina

References

Municipalities in Santa Catarina (state)